Stone Records is a British, independent, classical record label.

History
Stone Records was founded in 2008 by opera singer Mark Stone to produce his own recordings. He began by making CDs of English song, but the label soon attracted other artists interested in releasing independent recordings. As such its repertoire has widened to include instrumental, choral and orchestral works. The artist list has grown steadily over the first few years and includes important collaborations with the Oxford Lieder Festival, contemporary composers such as Ronald Corp and Paul Carr, and chamber ensembles the Lendvai String Trio and the Phoenix Piano Trio.

References 
 Bloomberg article 3 November 2010
 Spectator article 22 January 2010
 Musicweb international article 10 April 2009
 Metro article 26 March 2010

External links 
 Stone Records website

Classical music record labels
British record labels